Serenity (born October 29, 1969) is an American former pornographic actress who worked with Wicked Pictures and Hollywood Video. In 2002, she was ranked one of "The Top 50 Porn Stars of All Time" by Adult Video News. She also worked as a reporter for various news channels and is an outspoken advocate for animal rights.

Early life
Serenity was born in Fort Leonard Wood, Missouri, raised "everywhere from Maine to Mississippi", and moved to Las Vegas in the early 1990s. She holds a degree in journalism. She was a ballet dancer and waitress prior to entering the adult entertainment industry.

Career
Serenity started out stripping and modeling for men's magazines. Her first scene was with Alexis DeVell and PJ Sparxx in Jennifer Ate for Wicked Pictures in 1993. Her first boy/girl scene was in The Temptation of Serenity. She was a contract performer for Wicked Pictures between 1996 and December 31, 2001. In September 2002, she signed a one-year, multi-picture deal with Hollywood Video. She announced her retirement on September 22, 2004. With the exception of her first boy-girl scene, she always shot with condoms. AVN ranked her 36th on their list of "The Top 50 Porn Stars of All Time". She was also the first performer to win back-to-back AVN Awards for Best Actress - Video.

Mainstream media appearances
Serenity worked as a correspondent on E! during her porn career. She appeared in over twenty specials for Wild On!. In 1999, she appeared alongside Julia Ann in a skit for The Man Show. That same year, she appeared on Good Day L.A. reporting from Erotica LA. alongside Stephanie Swift. She made another appearance on the show shortly after. In 2000, she made appearances in Action and Frank Chindamo's The Dalai Camel. The Dalai Camel is part of an anthology titled Love Bytes.

Other ventures
In June 1999, Serenity launched Las Vegas Novelties, a sex toy manufacturer. She co-founded it with Mark Goodman. In 2001, she purchased Goodman's half of the company and became its sole proprietor. Las Vegas Novelties was acquired by Pipedream Products in March 2005.

In November 2002, Serenity, Peter Chan, and Steve Lane launched C & L Wholesalers, a Canberra, Australia-based company that sold adult products such as condoms, personal lubricants, and sex toys.

In May 2000, Serenity began reviewing pornographic films for Adult DVD Empire. She was also the publisher, as well as a columnist, for Showgirls magazine.

Advocacy
Serenity is a strong supporter of PETA. She has done fundraising auctions for PETA as well as radio and television interviews on their behalf. A photo of her wearing fake snakeskin chaps and a pleather corset was featured in PETA's Shopping Guide to Nonleather Products, which was released in October 2001. She's been an outspoken proponent of vegetarianism and received a nomination by PETA for Sexiest Vegetarian in 2003, five years after she became a vegetarian.

Personal life
Serenity identifies as bisexual. In 2003 the Sydney Morning Herald newspaper said, "Serenity, a feminist adult industry company executive, has become an unwilling poster girl for the gender power shift in an industry historically associated with exploitation." She married her business partner, Steve Lane. In September 2004, she was in her third trimester of pregnancy with their first child.

Awards and nominations

References

External links

 
 
 

1969 births
Actresses from Las Vegas
American columnists
American female adult models
American female erotic dancers
American erotic dancers
American film critics
American women film critics
American magazine publishers (people)
American pornographic film actresses
American sex industry businesspeople
American television reporters and correspondents
Bisexual pornographic film actresses
American LGBT businesspeople
LGBT dancers
American LGBT actors
LGBT people from Missouri
LGBT people from Nevada
Living people
People from Fort Leonard Wood, Missouri
Pornographic film actors from Missouri
Pornographic film actors from Nevada
American vegetarianism activists
American women television journalists
American women columnists
20th-century American actresses
21st-century American actresses
American women critics